The 1998 World Grand Prix was a darts tournament organised by the Professional Darts Corporation (PDC) and held at the Casino Rooms in Rochester, England between 14–18 October 1998. It was the first year of the tournament and replaced the World Pairs tournament, which ran from 1995 to 1997.

The tournament featured an unusual format in that players must start each leg by hitting a double - in addition to the traditional double to finish. It also featured a format of the best of three legs per set (rather than five) for the only time in the tournament history, a format usually associated with BDO events such as the Winmau World Masters. 

Phil Taylor took the inaugural title, beating world number one, Rod Harrington in the final.

Seeds

Prize money

Results

References

World Grand Prix (darts)
World Grand Prix Darts